Apodi may refer to:

 Apodi, Rio Grande do Norte, municipality in Rio Grande do Norte, Brazil
 Apodi River, river in Rio Grande do Norte, Brazil
 Apodi (footballer) (born 1986), Luís Dialisson de Souza Alves, Brazilian footballer